Lichiqucha (Quechua lichi milk (a borrowing from Spanish leche), qucha lake, "milk lake", also spelled Lichicocha) is a mountain in the Andes of Peru which reaches an altitude of approximately . It is located in the Junín Region, Yauli Province, Marcapomacocha District, and in the Lima Region, Huarochirí Province, in the districts of Carampoma and Huanza. Lichiqucha lies northwest of Liyunqucha.

References

Mountains of Peru
Mountains of Lima Region
Mountains of Junín Region